Napalm is an incendiary mixture of a gelling agent and a volatile petrochemical.

Napalm may also refer to:

Media
 NAM (video game) (also Napalm), a first-person shooter set during the Vietnam War
 Napalm and Silly Putty, a 2001 book by comedian George Carlin
 Wilder Napalm, a 1993 American dark fantasy romantic comedy film

Music
 Napalm (album), the seventh studio album by American rapper Xzibit
 Napalm Beach, an American rock band
 Napalm Death, an English grindcore band
 Napalm Records, an Austrian independent record label
 "Napalm Sticks to Kids", a rhythmic and rhyming performance